Gili (also Romanized as Gīlī and Gilli) is a village in Amanabad Rural District, in the Central District of Arak County, Markazi Province, Iran. At the 2006 census, its population was 280, in 97 families.

References 

Populated places in Arak County